Hugh Critz (December 21, 1876 – 1939) was the President of the Mississippi Agricultural and Mechanical College from 1930–1934. It was during his tenure that the Mississippi Legislature renamed the school Mississippi State University. Prior to that he had served as president of Arkansas Tech University.

Honors
Critz Hall at Mississippi State is named in his honor.

References

1876 births
1939 deaths
Presidents of Mississippi State University